Nikolai Pavlovich Chekhov (May 23, 1858 – June 29, 1889) was a Russian painter and the brother of Anton Chekhov.

Biography
As a child Nikolai showed talents for art and music. He attended the Moscow School of Painting, Sculpture and Architecture. He was unable to finish his studies due to chronic alcoholism and the periods of time, often weeks, which he would spend living in the Moscow streets.

Nikolai was a talented artist, and he often illustrated Anton's stories. Anton wrote to him, advising him to stay sober and to pursue writing, but to no avail. He died in Luka (in Lintvarev's (ru) country estate) at the age of 31 of tuberculosis. Nikolai's death influenced Anton's A Boring Story, about a man faced with his own impending death.

Gallery

References

1858 births
1889 deaths
Artists from Taganrog
People from Yekaterinoslav Governorate
Russian illustrators
Anton Chekhov
19th-century deaths from tuberculosis
19th-century painters from the Russian Empire
Russian male painters
Tuberculosis deaths in Ukraine
Moscow School of Painting, Sculpture and Architecture alumni